Scopula oppunctata is a moth of the  family Geometridae. It is found on the Solomon Islands.

Subspecies
Scopula oppunctata oppunctata
Scopula oppunctata plenistigma (Warren, 1905)

References

Moths described in 1902
oppunctata
Moths of Oceania